Black Island is a 2021 German film directed by Miguel Alexandre, written by Miguel Alexandre and Lisa Carline Hofer and starring Hanns Zischler, Alice Dwyer and Mercedes Müller.

Cast

References

External links 
 
 

2021 films
2020s German-language films
German thriller films
German-language Netflix original films